"Hey Child" (stylized in all caps) is a song by American rock band X Ambassadors. It was released as the second single from their second studio album, Orion, on April 19, 2019.

Composition
According to TuneBat.com, "Hey Child" is written in the key of F major and has a tempo of 112 beats per minute.

Music video
The video opens with a shot of a rail yard. Text appears on the background, saying "Hey. Haven’t heard from you in a while. So I figured this was the best way to reach out. This is a new song. I wrote it about us."

The music starts, and the frontman, Sam Harris, appears in the middle of a street and begins singing the song.

Charts

References

2019 singles
2019 songs
X Ambassadors songs
Kidinakorner singles
Interscope Records singles